This page includes a list of biblical proper names that start with P in English transcription. Some of the names are given with a proposed etymological meaning. For further information on the names included on the list, the reader may consult the sources listed below in the References and External Links.

A – B – C – D – E – F – G – H – I – J – K – L – M – N – O – P – Q – R – S – T – U – V – Y – Z

P
 Paola
 Padan-aram
 Padon
 Pagiel
 Pahath-Moab
 Pai, Pau
 Palestina
 Pallu
 Palti, son of Laish
 Palti, son of Raphu
 Pamphylia
 Paphos
 Parah
 Paran
 Parbar
 Parmashta
 Parmenas
 Parnach
 Parosh
 Parshandatha
 Paruah
 Pasach
 Pas-dammin
 Paseah
 Pashur
 Patara
 Pathros
 Patmos
 Patrobas
 Pau
 Paul, small
 Paulus
 Pedahzur
 Pedaiah
 Pekah
 Pekahiah
 Pekod
 Pelaiah
 Pelaliah
 Pelatiah
 Peleg
 Pelethites
 Pelonite
 Peniel
 Peninnah
 Pentapolis
 Pentateuch
 Pentecost
 Penuel
 Peor
 Perazim
 Peresh
 Perez
 Perez-Uzza
 Perga
 Pergamos
 Perida
 Perizzites
 Persia
 Persis
 Peruda
 Peter
 Pethahiah
 Pethuel
 Peulthai
 Phalec
 Phallu
 Phalti
 Phaltiel
 Phanuel
 Pharaoh
 Pharez
 Pharisees
 Pharpar
 Phebe
 Phenice
 Phichol
 Philadelphia
 Philemon
 Philetus
 Philip
 Philippi
 Philistines
 Philologus
 Phinehas
 Phlegon
 Phrygia
 Phurah
 Phygellus
 Phylacteries
 Pi-beseth
 Pi-hahiroth
 Pilate
 Pinon
 Piram
 Pirathon
 Pisgah
 Pisidia
 Pishon/Pison
 Pithom
 Pithon
 Pochereth
 Pontius
 Pontus
 Poratha
 Potiphar
 Potipherah
 Prisca
 Priscilla
 Prochorus
 Puah
 Publius
 Pudens
 Pul
 Punites
 Punon
 Putiel
 Puteoli

References
 Comay, Joan, Who's Who in the Old Testament, Oxford University Press, 1971, 
 Lockyer, Herbert, All the men of the Bible, Zondervan Publishing House (Grand Rapids, Michigan), 1958
 Lockyer, Herbert, All the women of the Bible, Zondervan Publishing 1988, 
 Lockyer, Herbert, All the Divine Names and Titles in the Bible, Zondervan Publishing 1988, 
 Tischler, Nancy M., All things in the Bible: an encyclopedia of the biblical world , Greenwood Publishing, Westport, Conn. : 2006

Inline references 

P